Pearl's Singer is a compilation album of live and studio tracks by Elkie Brooks. Compiled in 2001, it was issued on CD in the same year by Planet Song, in Germany only.

Track listing 
 "Pearl's a Singer"
 "Sail On"
 "Stairway to Heaven"
 "You Ain't Leavin'"
 "Keep It a Secret"
 "When the Hero Walks Alone"
 "Only Love will Set You Free"
 "What's a Matter Baby"
 "Can't Wait All Night"
 "Kiss Me for the Last Time"
 "Love is Over"
 "Foolish Games"
 "I Can Dream, Can't I?"
 "The Last Teardrop"
 "From the Heart"
 "Don’t Wanna Cry No More"
 "Break the Chain"
 "All or Nothing"

2001 compilation albums
Elkie Brooks albums